غعخححج

    
XMM may refer to:

 XMM-Newton (X-ray Multi-Mirror Mission), a space telescope
 XMM, registers of x86 microprocessors with Streaming SIMD Extensions
 Extended memory manager, in the Extended Memory Specification
 Intel XMM modems, in mobile devices

See also

 
 XM2 (disambiguation)
 XM (disambiguation)